Royal Noble Consort Gong-bin of the Jeonju Choi clan (Hangul: 공빈 최씨, Hanja: 恭嬪 崔氏) was a Korean royal consort and the spouse of King Yejong of Joseon.

Biography
The future Royal Noble Consort Gong-bin was born as the daughter of Choi Do-Il (최도일), from the Jeonju Choi clan. She was selected as the concubine for Yejong when he was still a Crown Prince in 11 June 1462 (8th year reign of Sejo of Joseon) and was honoured as Crown Prince's concubine rank junior 5 So-hun (소훈). It was unknown when she died and she had no any issue with Yejong. Her tomb was near from Princess Gyeonghye in Daeja-san, Goyang-si, Gyeonggi-do, South Korea.

References

Year of birth unknown
Year of death unknown
Royal consorts of the Joseon dynasty
Choe clan of Jeonju